The Houghton family is a prominent New England and Upstate New York business family. The Corning Glass Works were founded and run by some members of the family.

Family members and descendants
Their family includes:
 Amory Houghton Sr. (1812–1882), founder of Corning Glass Works (1851), married Sophronia Mann Oakes (1814–1880)
 Amory Houghton Jr. (1837–1909), former president of Corning Glass Works, married Ellen Ann Bigelow (1840–1918)
 Jesse Houghton Metcalf (1860–1942), United States Senator from Rhode Island (1924–1937)
 Alanson Bigelow Houghton (1863–1941), son of Amory Houghton Jr, former president of Corning Glass, former U.S. Representative from New York (1919–1922), former U.S. Ambassador to Germany (1922–1925), and former U.S. Ambassador to Britain (1925–1929), married Adelaide Wellington (1867–1945)
 Arthur A. Houghton Sr. (1866–1928), son of Amory Houghton Jr, former president of Corning Glass, married Mahitbel Hollister (1867–1938)
 William J. Tully (1870–1930), son-in-law of Amory Houghton Jr.; father of Alice Tully; New York State Senator 1905 to 1908 
 Katharine Martha Houghton Hepburn (1878–1951), suffragist and birth control advocate, mother of actress Katharine Hepburn
 Edith Houghton Hooker (1879–1948), suffragist
 Amory Houghton (1899–1981), son of Alanson Bigelow Houghton; father of Amo, Jamie, and Arthur Houghton; former Corning Glass president and chairman; and former Ambassador to France (1957–1961); ; co-founded the Corning Museum of Glass
 Alice Tully (1902–1993), granddaughter of Amory Houghton Jr, philanthropist and founding benefactor of Alice Tully Hall
 Arthur A. Houghton Jr. (1906–1990), philanthropist, former president of Steuben Glass Co., a former division of Corning Glass; co-founded the Corning Museum of Glass
 Katharine Houghton Hepburn (1907–2003), four-time Academy Award-winning actress, and named the greatest female star of classic Hollywood cinema by the American Film Institute.
 Amo Houghton (1926-2020), former CEO of Corning Glass and former U.S. Representative from New York (1987–2005)
 James R. Houghton (1936-2022), retired chairman of Corning Inc.
 Katharine Houghton (b. 1945), actress
 Mundy Hepburn (b. 1955), sculptor
 Schuyler Grant (b. 1970), actress, Anne of Green Gables

See also 
Wealthiest Americans (1957)
List of U.S. political families
President and Fellows of Harvard College (2006)
Corning Incorporated
Steuben Glass Works

External links 
Houghton Surname Project

American families
History of glass
Political families of the United States
People associated with the Corning Museum of Glass